Mahalakshmi or Mahalaxmi (the almighty Lakshmi) may refer to Lakshmi, the Hindu goddess of wealth, fortune, and prosperity; or to the fierce form of the goddess Durga which she took while protecting the world.

Places
 Mahalaxmi, Mumbai, a neighbourhood in Mumbai, Maharashtra
 Mahalaxmi railway station, a suburban railway station serving the neighbourhood
 Mahalaxmi Racecourse, a horse racing track in the neighbourhood
 Mahalaxmi Dhobi Ghat, a large open-air laundry in the neighbourhood
 Mahalaxmi, Indore, a suburb of Indore, Madhya Pradesh
 Mahalakshmi Layout, a suburb in north-western Bangalore, Karnataka
 Mahalakshmi metro station, a metro station serving the suburb
 Mahalaxmi, Lalitapur, a municipality in Lalitpur District, Nepal
 Mahalaxmi, Dhankuta, a municipality in Dhankuta District, Nepal

Temples dedicated to Mahalakshmi
 Mahalakshmi Temple, Kolhapur, a temple in Kolhapur, Maharashtra
 Mahalakshmi Temple, Mumbai, a temple in Mumbai, Maharashtra
 Mahalakshmi Temple, Hedavde, a temple in the Vasai Virar region of Maharashtra
Goravanahalli Mahalakshmi Temple

Other
 Mahalakshmi (TV series), a Tamil soap opera
 Mahalakshmi (Kannada actress), Indian film actress
 Mahalakshmi Vrata, a Hindu ceremony
 Mahalaxmi Iyer, an Indian playback singer
 Mahalaxmi Express, an express train belonging to Indian Railways that runs between Mumbai and Kolhapur